The Sun Chemist is a thriller by Lionel Davidson.

Plot summary

Letters in the archive correspondence of Chaim Weizmann, first president of Israel, hint that, in his profession as a distinguished organic chemist, Weizmann had stumbled on a method for the cheap synthesis of petroleum.  Now, decades later, a world buffeted by oil shocks and perpetually rising prices would welcome such a chemical miracle.   But Weizmann's laboratory notebooks must be found first, and an unseen and powerful enemy will stop at nothing to keep them hidden.

1976 British novels
British thriller novels
Novels set in Israel
Jonathan Cape books